Barnettown is an unincorporated community in Summers County, West Virginia, United States. Barnettown is served by West Virginia routes 3 and 12.

References

Unincorporated communities in Summers County, West Virginia
Unincorporated communities in West Virginia